The 11th Pan American Games were held in Havana, Cuba from August 2 to August 18, 1991.

Medals

Gold

 Men's 5000 metres - Arturo Barrios
 Men's 10000 metres - Martín Pitayo
 Men's 50 kilometre road walk - Carlos Mercenario
 Women's 10000 metres - María del Carmen Díaz
 Women's Marathon - Olga Appell
 Women's 50 kilometre road walk - Graciela Mendoza

 Women's Masters - Edda Piccini

 Men's Lightweight - Mario González

 Men's Single sculls - Joaquín Gómez
 Men's Lightweight Single sculls - Miguel García
 Men's Lightweight Coxless Pairs - Mexico
 Women's Double sculls - Mexico

 Men's Team 10 metre air pistol - Mexico

 Men's singles - Luis-Enrique Herrera

Silver

 Men's Recurve Team
 Women's Recurve Team

 Men's 5000 metres - Ignacio Fragoso
 Men's 20 kilometre road walk - Joel Sánchez Guerrero
 Men's 50 kilometre road walk - Miguel Ángel Rodríguez
 Women's 3000 metres - María del Carmen Díaz

 Men's Light Flyweight - Ricardo Sánchez López
 Men's Light Welterweight - Edgar Ruiz

 Men's C-2 500 metres - Mexico
 Men's C-2 1000 metres - Mexico

 Men's 10m Platform - Jesús Mena

 Women's Individual épée - Angélica Dueñas

 Men's Team - Mexico

 Men's Horizontal Bar - Luis López

 Women's Single sculls - Martha García
 Women's Lightweight Single sculls - María Montoya

 Women's 470 - Mexico

 Women's Duet - Sonia Cárdeñas & Lourdes Olivera

 Men's 54 kg - Agustín Ayala

 Men's Doubles - Mexico

 Men's Freestyle (52 kg) - Bernardo Olvera
 Men's Freestyle (74 kg) - Felipe Guzman

Bronze

 Men's Recurve: Ricardo Rojas
 Men's Recurve 30 m: Ricardo Rojas
 Men's Recurve 50 m: Ricardo Rojas
 Men's Recurve 70 m: Eduardo Messmacher
 Men's  Recurve 90 m: Ricardo Rojas
 Women's Recurve: Aurora Bretón
 Women's Recurve 30 m: Aurora Bretón
 Women's Recurve 50 m: Miriam Véliz
 Women's Recurve 60 m: Alejandra Garcia
 Women's Recurve 70 m: Aurora Bretón

 Women's 10000 metres - María Luisa Servín
 Women's 10000 metre track walk - Maricela Chávez

 Men's Team - Alfonso Rodríguez, Daniel Falconi, Luis Javier Iserte, Roberto Silva
 Women's Team - Edda Piccini, Ana Maria Avila, Leticia Rosas, Celia Flores

 Men's Bantamweight - Javier Calderón
 Men's Featherweight - Arnulfo Castillo
 Men's Welterweight - Santos Beltrán

 Men's C-1 500 metres - José Ferrer

 Men's 1m Springboard - Jorge Mondragon
 Men's 3m Springboard - Jorge Mondragon

 Team dressage - Mexico

 Women's individual épée - Yolitzin Martínez
 Women's team épée - Mexico

 Men's Parallel Bars - Luis López
 Men's Parallel Bars - Alejandro Peniche
 Men's Vault - Alejandro Peniche
 Men's Team - Mexico

 Men's Quadruple sculls - Mexico
 Men's Lightweight quadruple sculls - Mexico
 Women's Quadruple sculls - Mexico

 Men's Finn - Erick Mergenthaler

 Men's 100m freestyle: Rodrigo González
 Women's 4×100m Medley Relay: Heike Koerner, Monique Piñon, Gabriela Gaja, Laura Sánchez
 Women's 4×200m Freestyle Relay: Lorenza Muñoz, Maria S.Rivera, Heike Koerner, Laura Sánchez

 Women's Solo - Sonia Cárdeñas

 Men's 58 kg - Rafael Zúñiga
 Men's 70 kg - Víctor Estrada

 Men's Doubles - Mexico
 Women's Doubles - Mexico

 Men's Greco-Roman (68 kg) - Juan Mora

Results by event

See also
Mexico at the 1990 Central American and Caribbean Games
Mexico at the 1992 Summer Olympics

References

Nations at the 1991 Pan American Games
P
1991